Bayou is a 1957 motion picture directed by Harold Daniels. The drama is set in the Louisiana bayou region. Produced by American National Films, it was also shot in Barataria Bay, Louisiana, and most of the characters are Cajun residents of a rural fishing village. Bayou features one of the few lead roles by noted character actor Timothy Carey.

Plot
Martin Davis, a young Yankee architect, comes to New Orleans from the North to compete against a local man for the job of designing a new civic auditorium. On a visit to a carnival in the Cajun country of southern Louisiana, Martin meets Marie, a seventeen-year-old Cajun girl who works as a crabber in the bayou in order to support herself and her partly senile, alcoholic father Herbert. Marie has aroused the lust of the local storekeeper, Ulysses, a sadistic, illiterate bully who has attempted to rape her. After helping Marie to recover money stolen from her, Martin asks her to be his guide for the carnival activities. In order to impress the local building commissioner, Martin's contractor friend, Jim Tallant, enters him in a race using pirogues, primitive canoes hollowed out of tree trunks. Martin and Ulysses compete against each other and Ulysses, who greatly resents Martin's interest in Marie, wins when he deliberately cuts in front of Martin's canoe.

Despite Marie being underaged, Martin falls in love with her and arranges to stay longer in the area to pursue her. Ulysses threatens to harm Marie unless Herbert gets rid of Martin. Later, at a shivaree celebrating the marriage of an old man and a young girl, Marie performs a local folk dance. Ulysses then performs a strange, gyrating dance at the conclusion of which he challenges Martin to fight for Marie, but Martin walks away. Suddenly, the wind rises and a hurricane sweeps through the area, causing much devastation. While Martin and Marie seek shelter in an unoccupied house, Martin asks Marie to marry him and she accepts. Agitated by the hurricane, Herbert goes berserk and is killed by a falling tree. At Herbert's funeral, Ulysses makes a final effort to win Marie and taunts Martin into a brutal fight. However, Martin is victorious, and he and Marie leave the bayou to begin a new life together in the North.

Release and legacy
The film, distributed by United Artists, did poorly upon initial release. In 1960, it was acquired by Cinema Distributors of America, who edited the film, added a few scenes, and changed the title to Poor White Trash (not to be confused with a 2000 Michael Addis-directed film of the same title). The change of title was intended to make the movie seem more lurid and sleazy. The film was re-released in 1961 and met with greater commercial success, playing drive-ins for years in double features with exploitation films such as I Hate Your Guts! and Shanty Tramp.

Cast
 Peter Graves as Martin Davis
 Lita Milan as Marie Hebert
 Douglas Fowley as Emil Hebert
 Jonathan Haze as Bos
 Ed Nelson as Etienne (credited as Edwin Nelson)
 Eugene Sonfield as Jean Tithe
 Evelyn Hendrickson as Doucette
 Milton Schneider as Cousine
 Michael Romano as Felician
 Timothy Carey as Ulysses (credited as Tim Carey)

See also
 List of American films of 1957

References

External links
 
 

1957 films
Films shot in Louisiana
United Artists films
Films directed by Harold Daniels
1957 drama films
American drama films
1950s English-language films
1950s American films